Nuccio Costa (4 October 1925 – 27 February 1991) was an Italian television presenter.

Life and career 
Born in Catania, Costa began his artistic career at the end of the Second World War, when he hosted over two hundred stage shows for the Allied troops in Italy.  He later became the artistic director of the Teatro Stabile di Catania and made several RAI radio shows in couple with Turi Ferro.

Costa hosted several successful TV-programs, including two edition of the Sanremo Music Festival and several editions of Cantagiro.

In 1977 he created the beauty contest "La donna del Mediterraneo".

References

External links 

1925 births
1991 deaths
Mass media people from Catania
Italian television presenters
Italian radio presenters